Leandro Paulo Roberto Souza (born 23 February 1987) is a Brazilian footballer who plays for S.C.U. Torreense.

Club career
After playing for local club Lagartense, Leandro started his Portuguese journey playing for Ribeirão, Alpendorada, Mêda, Benfica Castelo Branco, Boavista, Mirandela in the third division. While playing for Mirandela, Leandro scored 15 goals and he became the third highest scorer in Portuguese Second Division.

In the summer of 2013, Leandro joined Doxa Katokopias of Cypriot First Division.

On the last day of the summer transfer window, 31 August 2014, Leandro signed a one-year deal with newly promoted Portuguese side Moreirense.

References

External links

1987 births
Living people
Association football forwards
Sportspeople from Pernambuco
Brazilian expatriate footballers
Brazilian footballers
Boavista F.C. players
Doxa Katokopias FC players
Moreirense F.C. players
Sport Benfica e Castelo Branco players
F.C. Famalicão players
C.D. Aves players
U.D. Leiria players
F.C. Vizela players
U.D. Vilafranquense players
S.C.U. Torreense players
Primeira Liga players
Segunda Divisão players
Cypriot First Division players
Liga Portugal 2 players
Brazilian expatriate sportspeople in Portugal
Brazilian expatriate sportspeople in Cyprus
Expatriate footballers in Portugal
Expatriate footballers in Cyprus